Richard Albert Bell,  (September 4, 1913 – March 20, 1988) was a member of the House of Commons of Canada representing Carleton from 1957 to 1963 and from 1965 to 1968.

He was born at Britannia Heights in Nepean Township, Ontario in 1913. He served as solicitor for Nepean Township and the City of Nepean.

Elected as a Progressive Conservative Member of Parliament in the government of John Diefenbaker, Bell was Minister of Citizenship and Immigration from 1962 to 1963.

Dick Bell Park on the Ottawa River, home of the Nepean Sailing Club, was named in his honour.

He died in Ottawa in 1988. He is buried in Pinecrest Cemetery in Ottawa.

The family home, "Fairfields", 3080 Richmond Rd. where he was born and died was donated to the city of Ottawa in 2000. Fairfields Heritage Property was built in the 1840s. The residence was rebuilt in the Gothic Revival style after a fire in 1870. The heritage home, which sits on 1.84 acres of the prominent Bell family's once extensive farm, was included amongst other architecturally interesting and historically significant buildings in Doors Open Ottawa, held June 2 and 3, 2012.

He was one of the founding partners of the law firm Bell Baker LLP located in Ottawa, Ontario.

Electoral history

Archives 
There is a Richard Albert Bell fonds at Library and Archives Canada. It contains 32.794 m of textual records and 330 photographs.

References

External links
 

Members of the House of Commons of Canada from Ontario
Members of the King's Privy Council for Canada
Politicians from Ottawa
Progressive Conservative Party of Canada MPs
1913 births
1988 deaths